Lethe europa, the bamboo treebrown, is a species of Satyrinae butterfly found in Asia.

Description

Inner third of hindwing covered with long brown hairs.

Male upperside rich dark brown. Forewing with the oblique short white discal fascia on the underside showing through, two obscure black spots or ocelli, followed by two prominent white spots, the upper one double, some black markings margined outwardly with pale dusky brown along terminal margins of both forewing and hindwing and an obscure subterminal pale line on the latter.

Underside very dark blackish brown; the wings crossed subbasally by a slender lilacine-white straight line, followed on forewing by an oblique short white discal fascia, and on both forewing and hindwing by a postdiscal series of large black ocelli and a terminal, somewhat ochraceous, narrow band bordered on the inner side by a more or less silvery purple line. The series on both forewing and hindwing margined inwardly and outwardly by silvery purple lunular lines, on the forewing curved inwards, on the hindwing curved outwards; the ocelli on forewing confluent, black, non-pupilled, on the hindwing black with disintegrate silvery-speckled irregular centres on a brown ground.

Female similar: forewing on upperside with an oblique broad white discal band, hindwing with a postdiscal incomplete series of black spots. Underside similar to the underside in the male, markings and ocelli larger.

Lethe europa tamuna de Nicéville is a race described originally from Little Nicobar. Michael Lloyd Ferrar (1948) reported seeing it from the Great Nicobar island in 1931. It has been rediscovered in recent times in the Campbell Bay area of Great Nicobar. Both adults and larvae were found along roadsides in disturbed forests. They were seen to breed on the bamboo Dinochloa andamanica Kurz. Eggs were laid on leaves deep inside the clump and never on the fringes.

Life history

Larva, green, paler beneath, fusiform; head with a single short erect horn; body attenuated suddenly from the 11th segment.

Pupa. Uniform pale green, stout, smooth, quite regular, except the head-case which is semidetached, broad and angular, with two sharp points in front (after Davidson & Aitken).

Gallery

References

External links
FLMNH Excellent photographs of male and female, from Sulawesi (authority determined)

europa
Butterflies of Asia
Butterflies of Singapore
Butterflies of Indochina
Taxa named by Johan Christian Fabricius
Butterflies described in 1787